Port Elgin is a Canadian community in Westmorland County, New Brunswick. It is located near the Nova Scotia border at the mouth of the Gaspereaux River where it empties into the Northumberland Strait's Baie Verte.

On 1 January 2023, Port Elgin amalgamated with all or part of six local service districts to form the new incorporated rural community of Strait Shores. The community's name remains in official use.

History

The village was founded by Acadians in 1690, but abandoned after the Expulsion of the Acadians in 1755. The earthworks of Fort Gaspareaux, a French military fortification from the Seven Years' War are located at the mouth of the river immediately east of the village.

Following the Seven Years' War and the American Revolutionary War, British Loyalists resettled in the area which was named Gaspareaux Town. Gaspareaux Town was renamed Port Elgin in 1847 in honour of Lord Elgin.  The community was incorporated as a village in 1922, the first community in the province to do so.

Throughout the 19th century and first half of the 20th century, Port Elgin experienced modest industrialization with a handful of small factories, tanneries, and sawmills. The village also saw some shipping activity with several wharves on a sheltered harbour at the mouth of the Gaspereau River. The New Brunswick and Prince Edward Island Railway was built through the village in the early 1880s, opening on September 9, 1886, to connect the Intercolonial Railway at Sackville with the seasonal port of Cape Tormentine which supported the winter iceboat service to Prince Edward Island; in 1917 this port became a terminal for the year-round ferry service to P.E.I.

Automobile traffic increased through the village in the 1920s after the P.E.I. ferries began to carry road vehicles.  The Baie Verte Road ran west of the village through Baie Verte as "Main Street" and the Immigrant Road ran east of the village.  In the 1960s a bypass for Route 16 as a result of Trans-Canada Highway project funding was constructed around Baie Verte and Port Elgin; a traffic circle called the "Port Elgin Rotary" was built at the intersection between Route 16 and Route 15 and Route 970.

The largest employer in the village is Atlantic Windows, which employs 200 persons year-round. The second largest employer is Westford Nursing Home, which has about 30 full and part-time staff and provides permanent care facility for 29 persons as well as one relief-care bed.

The village has a single school, Port Elgin Regional School, which provides public schooling for grades K-8; this school district encompasses all surrounding areas running as far east as Cape Tormentine, north to Robichaud and west to Jolicure.  The village also had its own high school but this was closed in the 1990s and high school students are now bused to Tantramar Regional High School in Sackville.

2010 coastal flooding
On January 2, 2010, the village experienced coastal flooding as a result of a storm surge from a nor'easter lifted cottages off their foundations and led to considerable damage to homes, forcing the declaration of a state of emergency in the village and surrounding area. The damage incurred by this storm is thought to be in the area of $900,000.

A second coastal flooding event occurred on December 21, 2010, when another storm surge from a nor'easter flooded sections of the village and surrounding area.

Demographics

See also
List of communities in New Brunswick

References

External links
 
 Village of Port Elgin

Communities in Westmorland County, New Brunswick
Former villages in New Brunswick
Populated places established in 1690
1690 establishments in the French colonial empire